Fauntleroy is a neighborhood in the southwest corner of Seattle, Washington. Part of West Seattle and situated on Puget Sound's Fauntleroy Cove (into which Fauntleroy Creek flows from its source in Fauntleroy Park), it faces Vashon Island, Blake Island, and the Kitsap Peninsula to the west. The neighborhood adjoins Lincoln Park to the north, Fauntlee Hills to the east, and Arbor Heights to the south. Within Fauntleroy is an area known as Endolyne (the "end of the line" of the Fauntleroy Park streetcar route in the early 1900s). Fauntleroy is home to an eponymous Washington State Ferries terminal, providing service to Vashon Island and Southworth. 

Fauntleroy Way runs into the West Seattle Bridge, which runs across the Duwamish Waterway (Duwamish River).

History
The neighborhood, creek, and park all take their name from the cove, itself named by one Lt. George Davidson of the U. S. Coast Survey in 1857 in honor of the family of his fiancée, Ellinor Fauntleroy of Indiana. The development of Fauntleroy began in 1905.

Fauntleroy's history was chronicled by Roy Morse and Richard Brown in Fauntleroy Legacy (1989) and by Clay Eals in West Side Story (West Seattle Herald, 1987).

Community
Central to the Fauntleroy neighborhood are Fauntleroy Church (United Church of Christ), Fauntleroy YMCA, and The Hall at Fauntleroy (the closed Fauntleroy School), which now houses Fauntleroy Children's Center (childcare); a caterer, rental auditorium and meeting rooms; and several other business tenants.

An all-volunteer, Community organization (Fauntleroy Community Association) founded in the early 1980s brings neighbors together to address local issues such as Environmental quality, Traffic and Parking.

References

External links
Seattle City Clerk's Neighborhood Map Atlas — Fauntleroy
Fauntleroy Community Association
Neighborhood Groups: Fauntleroy (West Seattle Herald)

West Seattle, Seattle
1905 establishments in Washington (state)